Ümit Özat (born 30 October 1976) is a Turkish professional football manager and former player.

Club career
Born in Ankara, Özat initially played for Gençlerbirliği and for Fenerbahçe as a central defender or a defensive midfielder. Later, he was converted to a full-back on the left side. He is right-footed, but still he played as left full-back. Mostly playing as a wingback and also supporting attackers, Özat was known for his unexpected long shots and rather successful crosses with his weak foot. He could also play the sweeper position when needed.

In May 2007, he signed a three-year contract with 1. FC Köln. On 29 August 2008, Özat collapsed during a Bundesliga match against Karlsruher SC. After losing consciousness for a short period and being treated on the field, he became responsive and was sent to hospital for further examination. Further testing has determined that the ex-club captain has a heart condition called myocarditis. On 14 March 2009, it became official that Özat had ended his career. His retirement was influenced by the collapse.

International career
Özat made his debut for Turkey on 16 August 2000 against Bosnia and Herzegovina. He played 41 times for the national team including at the 2002 FIFA World Cup in which they achieved third place. Özat scored one goal for his country in the process.

Managerial career
Özat's career continued as an assistant manager of Köln under Zvonimir Soldo, between his resign on 21 December 2009. He subsequently became Roger Lemerre's assistant at Ankaragücü, stepping up to become the manager when Lemerre was sacked in May 2010. His first managerial position was that of Ankaragücü, who he managed for over six months. After Ankaragücü, Özat also managed: Manisaspor, Elazığspor, Boluspor, Samsunspor, Mersin İdman Yurdu, Gençlerbirliği, Giresunspor and Adana Demirspor.

On 16 December 2019, he became the new manager of, at the time, Bosnian Premier League club Čelik Zenica, signing a contract with the club until the summer of 2021. In his first official game as Čelik manager, Özat's team lost in a 2–0 league game against Zrinjski Mostar on 23 February 2020. He left Čelik in June 2020.

Career statistics

Club

International

Managerial statistics

Honours

Player
Fenerbahçe
Süper Lig: 2003–04, 2004–05, 2006–07

Turkey
FIFA World Cup third-place: 2002

Turkey U-23
Mediterranean Games runner-up: 1997

References

External links

Umit Ozat at BBC.co.uk

1976 births
1. FC Köln players
2002 FIFA World Cup players
2. Bundesliga players
Association football defenders
Association football midfielders
Bundesliga players
Bursaspor footballers
Expatriate footballers in Germany
Fenerbahçe S.K. footballers
Footballers from Ankara
Gençlerbirliği S.K. footballers
Living people
Süper Lig managers
Süper Lig players
Turkey international footballers
Turkey under-21 international footballers
Turkish Alevis
Turkish expatriate footballers
Turkish expatriate sportspeople in Germany
Turkish footballers
Turkish football managers
Premier League of Bosnia and Herzegovina managers
MKE Ankaragücü managers
Manisaspor managers
Elazığspor managers
Boluspor managers
Samsunspor managers
Mersin İdman Yurdu managers
Gençlerbirliği S.K. managers
Giresunspor managers
Adana Demirspor managers
NK Čelik Zenica managers
Mediterranean Games silver medalists for Turkey
Competitors at the 1997 Mediterranean Games
Mediterranean Games medalists in football
Turkish expatriate football managers